Scymnus auritus is a species of beetle in family Coccinellidae. It is found in the Palearctic     
It is a tiny (2mm. -2.5 2mm.)  black ladybird associated with Quercus robur woodland.

Biology
In Central Europe it is a mainly found in deciduous forests, groves, and light forests. In spring, the beetles were found on flowering Prunus padus and Crataegus monogyna and later, on oaks and Tilia × europaea The insects feed on aphids on oaks, less frequently on other trees. S. auritus was also reported as  a predator of mites occurring on the underside of oak leaves; it also feeds on Phylloxeridae

Distribution
Europe, Cyprus, European Russia, the Caucasus, Siberia, the Russian Far East; Belarus, Ukraine, Moldova, Transcaucasia, Middle Asia, Western Asia, China.

References

External links
 R.D. Pope The Coccinellidae (Coleoptera) described by C. P. Thunberg
Images representing Scymnus at BOLD

Coccinellidae
Beetles of Europe
Beetles described in 1795